Afghanistan sent a delegation to compete at the 1936 Summer Olympics Berlin, Germany, from 1 to 16 August 1936. This was the nation's first appearance at a Summer Olympic Games and saw the nation sent 19 athletes to compete (but only 13 was confirmed). Most of these athletes competed in the men's field hockey team where they finished runner up in their group and not advancing to the knockout stage. The other two athletes competed in the sport of athletics with Mohammad Khan competing in the 100 meters sprint and long jump, failing to advance to the next stage of either of those events. Abdul Rahim competed in the shot put with him not advancing to the final.

Athletics

Afghanistan sent two athletes to compete in the athletics competitions. One was 25 year old, Mohammad Khan who in his only Olympics competed in two events. His first event was the men's 100 m which was held on the 26 July. Competing in heat three, he ended in last place to not qualify for the following stage. The other event that he competed in was the men's Long jump which was held eight days later. Khan wouldn't qualify to the semi-final as he wouldn't reach the 7.15 meters qualifying distance to go through to the semi-final.

Twenty-three year old Abdul Rahim competed in his only Olympics, and he competed in only one event during the games. That being the men's Shot put which was held on 2 August. Much like Khan, he wouldn't advance to the final, as he fell short of the 14.50 meters required to advance.
Track & road events

Field events

Field Hockey

Afghanistan entered a team in the field hockey competition for the first time. The team entered a squad of 18 (five of them being unknown). The national team were drawn in Group B with Denmark and host nation, Germany.

Head coach: Sardar Mohammed Yusuf Khan

Group B

Games

References

Nations at the 1936 Summer Olympics
1936
1936 in Afghan sport